Sportpark Eschen-Mauren is a multi-sport complex in Eschen, Liechtenstein. It is currently used mostly for football matches and is the home ground of USV Eschen/Mauren as well as Liechtenstein national youth football teams. It was the national stadium of Liechtenstein national football team until 1998 when the Rheinpark Stadion in Vaduz opened. Sportpark Eschen-Mauren, opened in 1975, has 500 covered seats and a total capacity of 2000.

The stadium featured three group stage matches at the 2003 UEFA European Under-19 Championship and six group stage matches at the 2010 UEFA European Under-17 Championship.

References

Football venues in Liechtenstein